Leptomiza is a genus of moths in the family Geometridae.

Species
Leptomiza bilinearia (Leech, 1897)
Leptomiza calcearia (Walker, 1860)
Leptomiza hepaticata (Swinhoe, 1900)
Leptomiza parableta Prout, 1926
Leptomiza prochlora Wehrli, 1936
Leptomiza rufitinctaria Hampson, 1902

References
Natural History Museum Lepidoptera genus database

Ourapterygini